Tyson Smith (born October 16, 1983), better known by the ring name Kenny Omega, is a Canadian-born professional wrestler. He is currently signed to All Elite Wrestling (AEW), of which he is also an executive vice president. Omega also appears in New Japan Pro-Wrestling (NJPW), where he is the current IWGP United States Heavyweight Champion in his second reign.

Before joining AEW, Omega was known for his tenure in New Japan Pro-Wrestling (NJPW), during which he held the IWGP Heavyweight Championship, the IWGP Intercontinental Championship, the inaugural IWGP United States Heavyweight Champion, as well as several other titles. Also known for his video games-inspired persona, he was a member of the Bullet Club stable, later serving as the group's leader. Throughout his career, Omega has also performed as part of independent promotions worldwide, including DDT Pro-Wrestling, Jersey All Pro Wrestling, and Pro Wrestling Guerrilla, as well as larger national and international promotions, such as Ring of Honor, Impact Wrestling, and Lucha Libre AAA Worldwide. While wrestling in the last two promotions, he held the Impact World Championship and AAA Mega Championship. In AEW, he is a former one-time AEW World Champion, one-time AEW World Tag Team Champion (with Adam Page), and was one-third of the inaugural AEW World Trios Champions with The Young Bucks (Matt Jackson and Nick Jackson).

Hailed as one of the best professional wrestlers in the world, Omega was named Sports Illustrateds Wrestler of the Year in 2017 and topped Pro Wrestling Illustrateds list of top 500 male wrestlers the following year and in 2021. He has also attained the latter publication's Match of the Year distinction three times; one of those matches, in which Omega competed against Kazuchika Okada in a two out of three falls match at Dominion 6.9 in Osaka-jo Hall in June 2018, received a seven-star rating from combat sports journalist Dave Meltzer, the highest rating Meltzer has ever awarded a professional wrestling match. He was inducted into the Wrestling Observer Newsletter Hall of Fame in 2020.

Early life
Tyson Smith was born in Winnipeg, Manitoba, on October 16, 1983. He grew up in Transcona, a Winnipeg suburb. As of 2016, Smith's mother works in family services while his father works for the Canadian government as a transport officer. Smith's affinity toward professional wrestling began during childhood when he watched tapes of WWE (then-WWF)'s Saturday Night's Main Event, which became his favorite program. Growing up, Smith played ice hockey as a goalie. He also worked at branches of retailers IGA and Costco.

Smith first became interested in a career in professional wrestling after one of his friends from Transcona Collegiate Institute (TCI) began training with Top Rope Championship Wrestling (TRCW) in Winnipeg. Smith ended his ice hockey career plans and began training under TRCW promoter Bobby Jay, whom he met while he was stacking shelves at an IGA store. After training with Jay for a year, 16-year-old Smith made his professional wrestling debut in the year 2000. He went on to wrestle as part of TRCW for two years, where he developed the gimmick of a Hawaiian surfer named Kenny Omega. The surfer aspect was later dropped and replaced with an otaku-influenced gimmick. In 2001, he graduated from TCI and enrolled in university, but dropped out during his first year in order to fully pursue professional wrestling.

Professional wrestling career

Independent circuit and WWE (2001–2011)
In 2001, Omega debuted in the Winnipeg-based promotion Premier Championship Wrestling (PCW). He won the PCW Heavyweight Championship and the PCW Tag Team Championship in 2003 and 2004, respectively. He unsuccessfully challenged Petey Williams for the TNA X Division Championship at the National Wrestling Alliance's 56th Anniversary Show on October 17. He later won an eight-man tournament, defeating Nate Hardy, Chris Sabin, and Amazing Red, to win the Premier Cup and the NWA Canada X-Division Championship on June 2. After competing for Harley Race's promotion World League Wrestling in September 2005, losing to Keith Walker in a match, Omega was invited to a week-long tryout by World Wrestling Entertainment (WWE).

In October 2005, Smith was sent to Deep South Wrestling (DSW), WWE's then-developmental territory for a tryout, after which he was offered a developmental contract and subsequently assigned to DSW full-time. In August 2006, he requested his release from his contract. Omega later stated that his time in DSW was poor, particularly criticizing promoters Bill DeMott and Jody Hamilton, and trainer Bob Holly. Nevertheless, he expressed praise for trainer Dave Taylor. WWE has since reportedly approached him with contracts in the spring of 2014, three times in 2015, and in early 2019.

After his release from WWE, Omega intended to forge a career in mixed martial arts and entered Brazilian jiu-jitsu tournaments before deciding to return to professional wrestling. He then reinvented his wrestling persona and developed a new distinct move set. On March 8, 2008, Omega competed for Jersey All Pro Wrestling (JAPW) and captured the JAPW Heavyweight Championship by defeating Low Ki. On April 19, he retained his title against Frankie Kazarian at Spring Massacre. Omega lost the JAPW Heavyweight Championship to Jay Lethal at Jersey City Rumble on February 28, 2009.

Omega competed in a six-way elimination match for the JAPW Light Heavyweight Championship on December 10, 2010, during which he was eliminated by the eventual winner, Jushin Thunder Liger. On May 15, 2011, he defeated Liger in Philadelphia, Pennsylvania during New Japan Pro-Wrestling's inaugural US tour to win the JAPW Light Heavyweight Championship. That same year, Omega wrestled in tapings for Wrestling Revolution Project, performing under the ring name Scott Carpenter. In a July 2013 interview, he said that although JAPW had not held a show since April 2012, he would be interested in returning to the company, citing how he still held the JAPW Light Heavyweight Championship. JAPW declared the Light Heavyweight Championship vacant on September 12, 2014. He went on to make appearances during PCW events in October 2018 and March 2019.

DDT Pro-Wrestling (2008–2014)

In 2006, Omega became captivated by Japanese wrestler Kota Ibushi after watching him perform as part of Japanese promotion DDT Pro-Wrestling, so he uploaded videos of himself having a DDT-style match to YouTube, in hopes they would interest Ibushi into working with him. After seeing the videos, DDT invited Omega to Japan to wrestle Ibushi, which Omega accepted; he made his first appearance for the promotion in August 2008. Omega stated that wrestling in Japan had been one of his dreams, as the local scene appealed to his creative side, feeling that he was able to show his personality and express himself. He and Ibushi then formed a tag team named the Golden☆Lovers.

In 2011, Omega competed in a match against a nine-year-old girl named Haruka. A video of the match went viral, making international news and receiving polarizing responses, after which Omega received death threats. Fellow professional wrestler Mick Foley, conversely, praised Omega's work as a heel, asking why he was not on national television. Omega later stated that he was asked to work with Haruka due to the safe nature of his work and that he personally trained her before their match. In the same year, Omega represented DDT in All Japan Pro Wrestling's 2011 Junior League, making his debut for the promotion on September 11. After three wins and two losses, he finished second in his block and did not advance to the finals.

On October 23, Omega defeated Kai to become the new World Junior Heavyweight Champion. He lost the title back to Kai on May 27, 2012, in his sixth title defense. On December 23, Omega defeated El Generico to win the KO-D Openweight Championship for the first time. On January 27, 2013, Omega defeated Isami Kodaka in a title vs. title match, retaining his title and winning the DDT Extreme Championship held by Kodaka. He lost the KO-D Openweight Championship to Shigehiro Irie on March 20, 2013. On May 26, Omega, Ibushi, and Gota Ihashi defeated Yuji Hino, Antonio Honda, and Daisuke Sasaki to win the KO-D 6-Man Tag Team Championship. Omega's team lost the championship to Hino, Honda, and Hoshitango. On August 25, Omega lost the DDT Extreme Championship to Danshoku Dino.

On January 26, 2014, the Golden☆Lovers defeated the respective teams of Kodaka and Yuko Miyamoto as well as Konosuke Takeshita and Tetsuya Endo in a three-way match to win the KO-D Tag Team Championship. The team of the Golden☆Lovers and Sasaki won the KO-D 6-Man Tag Team Championship from Irie, Keisuke Ishii, and Soma Takao in April but lost the title to Kudo, Masa Takanashi, and Yukio Sakaguchi the following month. On September 28, the Golden☆Lovers lost the KO-D Tag Team Championship to Takeshita and Endo. Omega returned to DDT for the promotion's Ultimate Party event on November 3, 2019, during which he and Riho scored a victory over Honda and Miyu Yamashita in a tag team match.

Pro Wrestling Guerrilla (2008–2014)

On November 1, 2008, Omega appeared for Pro Wrestling Guerrilla (PWG) during the 2008 Battle of Los Angeles, where he was defeated in the first round of the tournament by local talent Brandon Bonham. The next night, during a three-way tag team match in which Omega competed, he was Irish whipped into the ropes by Davey Richards, only for the force to snap the middle and bottom ropes, throwing Omega out of the ring. Three months later, Omega returned to the promotion at Express Written Consent, where he was defeated by El Generico after referee Rick Knox hit him with a leaping clothesline after Knox grew tired of Omega abusing him. At PWG's hundredth show on April 12, 2009, he lost to Bryan Danielson.

On November 20, 2009, Omega entered the year's Battle of Los Angeles, which was contested for the vacant PWG World Championship, defeating Kevin Steen, Scott Lost, and Joey Ryan in the first, quarter, and semifinal rounds, respectively. He defeated Roderick Strong in the final round to win the tournament and become the PWG World Champion. On February 27, 2010, Omega lost the championship to Richards at As the Worm Turns in his first defense.

On October 27, 2012, Omega made his first appearance for PWG in over two and a half years at Failure to Communicate when he teamed with El Generico in a tag team match, where they defeated The Young Bucks (Matt and Nick Jackson). Omega returned to PWG to compete in the 2014 Battle of Los Angeles on August 29, advancing all the way to the semifinals until he was eliminated by the eventual winner of the tournament, Ricochet. He returned again for the 2017 Battle of Los Angeles on September 2, teaming with The Young Bucks and defeating Flamita, Penta 0M, and Rey Fenix in a six-man tag team match.

New Japan Pro-Wrestling and Ring of Honor

Sporadic appearances (2008–2014)
On July 25, 2008, Omega appeared for the promotion Ring of Honor (ROH), losing to Delirious in Toronto, Ontario. The following night, Omega competed at ROH New Horizons, losing to Silas Young. The following year, he defeated Austin Aries, Jay Briscoe, and Roderick Strong in a Four-Corner Survival match. On November 14, 2009, Omega competed against Aries for the ROH World Championship but was defeated. At Final Battle 2009, he competed in a Four-Corner Survival match, which was won by Claudio Castagnoli. In September 2010, Omega competed for New Japan Pro-Wrestling (NJPW), losing to Prince Devitt in a match for Devitt's IWGP Junior Heavyweight Championship. On October 11 at Destruction '10, the Golden☆Lovers defeated Apollo 55 (Devitt and Ryusuke Taguchi) to win the IWGP Junior Heavyweight Tag Team Championship. On January 23, 2011, at Fantastica Mania 2011, an NJPW and Consejo Mundial de Lucha Libre co-promoted event in Tokyo, the Golden☆Lovers lost title back to Apollo 55. He also competed in the 2010 and 2011 Best of the Super Juniors tournaments.

Omega returned to NJPW in May 2013 to take part in the 2013 Best of the Super Juniors, where he managed to win five out of his eight round-robin matches, advancing to the semifinals of the tournament. On June 9, Omega was defeated in his semifinal match by Devitt, following interference from Devitt's stable, Bullet Club. A year later, he took part in New Japan's 2014 Best of the Super Juniors tournament from May 30 to June 6, finishing with a record of three wins and four losses, with a loss against Taichi on the final day, which cost him a spot in the semifinals.

Bullet Club and various championship reigns (2014–2017)

On October 3, 2014, NJPW held a press conference to announce that Omega was set to sign with the promotion once his DDT contract expired on October 26. Omega, dubbing himself the Cleaner, made his debut under contract on November 8 at Power Struggle, where he was revealed as the newest member of Bullet Club, despite having previously dismissed the idea of joining the villainous foreigner stable, claiming that he did not consider himself a gaijin. Omega defeated Ryusuke Taguchi to win the IWGP Junior Heavyweight Championship for the first time at Wrestle Kingdom 9 in Tokyo Dome on January 4, 2015. He retained the title over Taguchi in a rematch on February 11 at The New Beginning in Osaka. In the following months, he successfully defended the title against Máscara Dorada at Invasion Attack 2015 and Alex Shelley at Wrestling Dontaku 2015.

Omega lost the title to Kushida on July 5 at Dominion 7.5 in Osaka-jo Hall. On September 23 at Destruction in Okayama, he regained the title from Kushida, following an interference from Bullet Club stablemate Karl Anderson. On January 4, 2016, Omega once again lost the title to Kushida at Wrestle Kingdom 10 in Tokyo Dome. The following day, Omega teamed with Bullet Club leader A.J. Styles to defeat Shinsuke Nakamura and Yoshi-Hashi in a tag team match. After the match, Bullet Club turned on Styles, with Omega taking over the leadership of the stable.

At The New Beginning in Niigata on February 14, 2016, Omega defeated Hiroshi Tanahashi to win the vacant IWGP Intercontinental Championship. Six days later, he and The Young Bucks–the Bullet Club subgroup known as The Elite–won the NEVER Openweight 6-Man Tag Team Championship from The Briscoe Brothers and Toru Yano at Honor Rising: Japan 2016, an event co-produced by NJPW and ROH. That same month, Omega had signed on to become a regular competitor for ROH. The Elite lost the title to Tanahashi, Michael Elgin, and Yoshitatsu on April 10 at Invasion Attack 2016. On April 27, Omega retained the IWGP Intercontinental Championship over Elgin, which marked the first time two Canadians main evented an NJPW event. On May 3 at Wrestling Dontaku 2016, The Elite regained the NEVER Openweight 6-Man Tag Team Championship. On June 19 at Dominion 6.19 in Osaka-jo Hall, Omega lost the IWGP Intercontinental Championship to Elgin in NJPW's inaugural ladder match. On July 3, The Elite lost the NEVER Openweight 6-Man Tag Team Championship to Matt Sydal, Ricochet, and Satoshi Kojima.

From July 22 to August 13, Omega took part in the round-robin portion of the 2016 G1 Climax, where he advanced to the finals after winning his block with a record of six wins and three losses. On August 14, he defeated Hirooki Goto in the finals of the tournament and earned an opportunity to compete for the IWGP Heavyweight Championship. Omega not only won the tournament in his first attempt, but also became the first non-Japanese G1 Climax winner in history. Towards the end of the year, despite having the opportunity to return to ROH, Omega was asked by NJPW not to take any outside bookings heading into Wrestle Kingdom 11 in Tokyo Dome. Due to this, Omega did not appear for ROH for the rest of 2016. He lost to IWGP Heavyweight Champion Kazuchika Okada in the main event of Wrestle Kingdom 11 on January 4, 2017. At 46 minutes and 45 seconds, the match was, at the time, the longest in the history of the January 4 Tokyo Dome Show. This record was broken by a 2021 match between Kota Ibushi and Tetsuya Naito. Wrestling journalist Dave Meltzer gave the match a six-star rating in the Wrestling Observer Newsletter, adding that Omega and Okada "may have put on the greatest match in pro wrestling history". The match was also praised by fellow professional wrestlers Daniel Bryan, Mick Foley, and Stone Cold Steve Austin.

Dissension within Bullet Club and departure (2017–2019)
On January 6, 2017, Omega stated that he would be "stepping away from Japan to reassess [his] future", adding that he was "weighing all options". On January 26, Omega announced on Wrestling Observer Radio that he would be flying back to Japan in February to negotiate a new deal with NJPW for "at least one more year". He returned during the first night of Honor Rising: Japan 2017 in February. Omega competed against Kazuchika Okada in a match for the IWGP Heavyweight Championship on June 11 at Dominion 6.11 in Osaka-jo Hall, which ended in a 60-minute time limit draw. The match was rated 6 stars by Dave Meltzer, higher than their previous match, making it the highest-rated match by Meltzer at that time.

During the G1 Special in USA in July 2017, Omega defeated Michael Elgin, Jay Lethal, and Tomohiro Ishii in an eight-man tournament to become the inaugural IWGP United States Heavyweight Champion. The event also saw signs of dissension between Omega and new Bullet Club member Cody. On August 12, Omega won his block in the 2017 G1 Climax tournament with a record of seven wins and two losses, advancing to the finals, where he was eventually defeated by Tetsuya Naito. He successfully defended his title against Juice Robinson on September 24 at Destruction in Kobe and against Yoshi-Hashi on October 15 at the NJPW and ROH-co-produced Global Wars: Chicago event.

At Wrestle Kingdom 12 on January 4, 2018, Omega defeated the debuting Chris Jericho in a no disqualification match to retain the IWGP United States Heavyweight Championship. The bout was credited as having grown international interest in NJPW, particularly from North America. On January 28, Omega lost the title to Jay White at The New Beginning in Sapporo. After the match, Bullet Club member Adam Page confronted White but was stopped by Omega, who accepted defeat, which brought out Cody. After months of tension over the leadership of the Bullet Club faction, Cody hit Omega with a rolling cutter. When Page attempted to assist Cody in attacking Omega, Kota Ibushi returned to the ring after having competed earlier in the night to save his former partner, leading to an embrace between Omega and Ibushi and a rekindling of their friendship. Omega returned to ROH for the Supercard of Honor XII event on April 7, 2018, where he lost to Cody.

On June 9, Omega defeated Okada in a two out of three falls match with no time limit for the IWGP Heavyweight Championship at Dominion 6.9 in Osaka-jo Hall, becoming the first Canadian wrestler to win the title in the process. The match received a seven-star rating from Meltzer, which remains the highest rating ever given to a match. Omega then defeated Cody to retain his title at NJPW's G1 Special in San Francisco on July 7. Following the match, Bullet Club members Tama Tonga, Tanga Loa, Bad Luck Fale, and King Haku attacked Omega, Cody, and every other Bullet Club member who tried to aid them, forming their own branch within the stable. Omega and Cody subsequently reconciled alongside the rest of Bullet Club.

In September 2018, Omega appeared at the independent event All In, where he defeated Penta El Zero. He successfully defended the IWGP Heavyweight Championship against Ishii at Destruction later that month as well as against Cody and Ibushi in a three-way match at King of Pro-Wrestling the next month. It was revealed in October that Cody, Page, and Marty Scurll would be known alongside Omega and The Young Bucks as part of The Elite, with the group also stating that they were "no longer affiliated with Bullet Club". Pro Wrestling Illustrated named Omega the No. 1 professional wrestler of 2018 in its annual list of the top 500 male wrestlers. Omega lost the IWGP Heavyweight Championship to Hiroshi Tanahashi at Wrestle Kingdom 13 on January 4, 2019, ending his reign at 209 days. He departed NJPW after his contract expired at the end of January.

All Elite Wrestling and Impact Wrestling

Early storylines and world championship reigns (2019–2021)

Omega signed a four-year contract with All Elite Wrestling (AEW) on February 7, 2019. Along with Matt and Nick Jackson, Omega serves as an executive vice president of the promotion as well as one of its in-ring talents. He competed at the promotion's inaugural event, Double or Nothing, where he lost to Chris Jericho in the main event, after which both men were attacked by Jon Moxley. The following month at Fyter Fest, Omega attacked Moxley in retaliation for Moxley's previous assault. A match between Omega and Moxley was scheduled for the All Out pay-per-view, however, Moxley pulled out of the match due to a MRSA infection. Omega instead competed against Pac at All Out, where he was defeated. On the premiere episode of Dynamite on October 2, Omega was taken out by a returning Moxley during a six-man tag team match, with Omega's team later losing the contest. In the main event of Full Gear on November 9, Omega was defeated by Moxley in an unsanctioned Lights Out match.

At Chris Jericho's Rock 'N' Wrestling Rager at Sea Part Deux: Second Wave, which aired on the January 22, 2020, episode of Dynamite, Omega and Adam Page defeated SoCal Uncensored (Frankie Kazarian and Scorpio Sky) to win the AEW World Tag Team Championship, marking the first title change in the promotion's history. At Revolution on February 29, Omega and Page retained the championship against The Young Bucks. Omega, Page, and The Young Bucks competed alongside Matt Hardy against The Inner Circle–which comprises Jericho, Sammy Guevara, Jake Hager, and Santana and Ortiz–in a Stadium Stampede match on May 23 at Double or Nothing, where Omega's team was victorious. On September 5 at All Out, Omega and Page lost the AEW World Tag Team Championship to FTR (Cash Wheeler and Dax Harwood).

Following the loss to FTR, Omega stated that he was going to return to singles competition. From October to November 2020, he participated in a tournament to determine the number one contender for the AEW World Championship and won it by defeating Adam Page in the final round at Full Gear. At Winter Is Coming on December 2, Omega defeated Jon Moxley to become the AEW World Champion for the first time, with the help of Don Callis, and turned heel. Following the win, he appeared alongside Callis for Impact Wrestling on the December 8 episode of its program, Impact!, establishing a partnership between the two. At the Hard To Kill pay-per-view in January 2021, he competed for the promotion, teaming with fellow former Bullet Club stablemates Karl Anderson and Doc Gallows to defeat Rich Swann, Chris Sabin, and Moose. At Revolution in March, Omega retained the title over Moxley in an Exploding Barbed Wire Deathmatch.

At Impact Wrestling's Rebellion pay-per-view in April 2021, Omega defeated Swann in a Winner Takes All match to retain his AEW World Championship and also win the Impact World Championship. The following month, he successfully defended the AEW World Championship at the Double or Nothing event against Pac and Orange Cassidy in a three-way match. At Slammiversary, Omega defeated Sami Callihan in a no disqualification match to retain the Impact World Championship. On the premiere episode of Rampage on August 13, he lost the Impact World Championship to Christian Cage. At All Out in September, Omega defeated Cage to retain the AEW World Championship. His victory celebration with The Elite–comprising Omega, The Young Bucks, Gallows, and Anderson–saw the debuts of Adam Cole, who embraced the group, and Bryan Danielson, who joined Cage's side. He lost the title to Page in November at Full Gear. That same year, Pro Wrestling Illustrated ranked him No. 1 on its list of the top 500 male professional wrestlers for the second time. Omega took a hiatus from competing in November 2021 due to injuries. He underwent hernia and knee surgeries.

Return from injury and suspension (2022–present)
Omega returned on the August 17, 2022, episode of Dynamite as The Young Bucks' mystery partner in the inaugural AEW World Trios Championship tournament, where they defeated La Facción Ingobernable (Andrade El Idolo, Rush, and Dragon Lee) in the first round. The following week, they defeated United Empire (Will Ospreay and Aussie Open (Mark Davis and Kyle Fletcher)) in the second round. At All Out on September 4, The Elite defeated "Hangman" Adam Page and The Dark Order (Alex Reynolds and John Silver) to become the inaugural AEW World Trios Champions.

After the All Out post-event media scrum, Omega and The Young Bucks got into a legitimate physical altercation with AEW World Champion CM Punk and his friend Ace Steel, following comments he had made about them and others during the scrum. As a result, AEW president Tony Khan suspended all involved. On the September 7 episode of Dynamite, Khan announced that both the World Championship and Trios Championship, held by Omega and the Bucks, were vacated.

Lucha Libre AAA Worldwide (2019–2021)
In 2019, AEW announced a partnership with Lucha Libre AAA Worldwide, and Omega made his debut for the latter promotion at its Triplemanía XXVII event, teaming with Matt and Nick Jackson in a losing effort against Fénix, Pentagón Jr., and Laredo Kid. At Héroes Inmortales XIII in October, Omega won the AAA Mega Championship from Fénix. He retained the title against Dragon Lee at Triplemanía Regia in December and against Laredo Kid at Triplemanía XXVIII the following year. He defeated Andrade El Idolo to remain the AAA Mega Champion at Triplemanía XXIX in August 2021. In November, Omega vacated the AAA Mega Championship due to injuries, ending his reign as the title's longest-reigning holder.

Return to New Japan Pro Wrestling (2022-present)
On November 20 at Historic X-Over, Omega returned to New Japan Pro-Wrestling via a video message, challenging IWGP United States Heavyweight Champion Will Ospreay, who had just defended his title against Shota Umino, to a match for the title at Wrestle Kingdom 17, which Ospreay immediately accepted. On January 4, 2023 at Wrestle Kingdom 17; Omega defeated Ospreay to win the title for the second time. The following day at New Year Dash, Omega teamed with longtime rival and IWGP World Heavyweight Champion, Kazuchika Okada to defeat the United Empire's, Aaron Henare and Jeff Cobb.

Professional wrestling style and persona

A fan of video games, Smith incorporates ideas from the medium into wrestling maneuvers, entrance music, and gimmick concepts. The Kenny Omega ring name was originally inspired by the character Omega Weapon from the Final Fantasy video game series. He named his finishing maneuver the One-Winged Angel (a reference to Final Fantasy VII character Sephiroth) and the running knee strike he employs as a signature maneuver the V-Trigger (a technique used in Street Fighter V); integrated the Hadouken attack from the Street Fighter series as a signature move; and used of variations of Mega Man antagonist Dr. Wily's theme music as entrance themes. For his final appearance for NJPW at Wrestle Kingdom 13, Smith collaborated with Undertale creator Toby Fox to create a custom entrance video in the style of the game. In addition to video games, Smith also draws inspiration from the television show Star Trek: The Next Generation and superhero cartoons to develop elements of his in-ring persona. At Fyter Fest in June 2019, Smith also donned ring gear that references the character Akuma from the Street Fighter series.

During his run in Bullet Club, Smith did his interviews entirely in English, refusing to speak Japanese. In an interview, he stated that he was told that his otaku gimmick was "too bubbly" for Bullet Club, which led to him adopting the Cleaner nickname as a reference to people who clean up crime scenes. Smith cited the character Albert Wesker from the Resident Evil video game series as well as Sylvester Stallone's character, Marion "Cobra" Cobretti, from the film Cobra as inspirations for the Cleaner gimmick. Although Smith originally intended to embody the gimmick straightforwardly, he later integrated comedy into the persona as a response to people who thought he was portraying a janitor, doing so by coming out for his matches holding a mop and a broom.

Personal life
Smith considers himself straight edge, as he abstains from alcohol, tobacco, and drug consumption. He has a younger sister. Smith has suffered from vertigo since 2018. He is close friends with fellow professional wrestler and former tag team partner Michael Nakazawa.

Smith is fluent in Japanese, and as of August 2018, he resided in the Katsushika ward in the east end of Tokyo. Smith told ESPN.com in October 2016 that he "loved Japanese culture before even realizing it was, in fact, Japanese culture" and that his favorite video games and cartoons were Japanese. He has since obtained Japanese citizenship. Regarding his life outside of wrestling, Smith said in 2016 that he had no time to think about relationships because he was completely focused on his wrestling goals.

A self-professed avid gamer, Smith hosted a YouTube series called Cleaner's Corner, in which he played some of his favorite video games. He also attends video game conventions during his spare time. On June 26, 2016, he made a special guest appearance at Community Effort Orlando, defeating fellow professional wrestler Xavier Woods in a game of Street Fighter V. Smith portrayed the character Cody Travers in a live-action portion in a trailer for Street Fighter V: Arcade Edition in 2018.

Mixed martial arts record 

|-
|Loss
|align=center|4–3
|Brett Jensen 
|Submission 
|UCE: Round 32 - Episode 2
|
|align=center|1
|align=center|0:42
|Salt Lake City, Utah, United States 
|
|-
| Loss 
|align=center|4–2
|Travis Fulton
|TKO (punches)
|CVFA: Return of the Champions 
|
|align=center|1
|align=center|1:24
|Iowa, United States 
|
|-
|Win
|align=center|4–1
|Clayton Swanson 
|KO (punch)
|Whiskey Junction Beatdown 8
|
|align=center|1
|align=center|0:42
|Minneapolis, Minnesota, United States 
|
|-
|Win
|align=center|3–1
|Larry Zykstra
|Submission (rear-naked choke)
|Whiskey Junction Beatdown 4
|
|align=center|1
|align=center|1:43
|Minneapolis, Minnesota, United States 
|
|-
|Win
|align=center|2–1
|Jeremy Homan 
|TKO (submission to punches)
|rowspan=2|Whiskey Junction Beatdown 3
|rowspan=2|
|align=center|1
|align=center|0:24
|rowspan=2|Minneapolis, Minnesota, United States 
|
|-
|Win
|align=center|1–1
|Mark Cantrell
|TKO (punches)
|align=center|1
|align=center|1:43
|
|-
|Loss
|align=center|0–1
|Dan Severn
|Submission 
|Action Wrestling Entertainment 
|
|align=center|1
|align=center|4:12
|Canada 
|
|-

Championships and accomplishments

 4 Front Wrestling
 4FW Junior Heavyweight Championship (1 time)
 All Elite Wrestling
 AEW World Championship (1 time)
 AEW World Tag Team Championship (1 time) – with Adam Page
 AEW World Trios Championship (2 times, inaugural) – with Matt Jackson and Nick Jackson
 AEW World Championship Eliminator Tournament (2020)
 AEW World Trios Championship Tournament (2022) – with Matt Jackson and Nick Jackson
 AEW Dynamite Awards (3 times)
 Bleacher Report PPV Moment of the Year (2021) 
 Biggest WTF Moment (2021) – 
 Wrestler of the Year (2022)
 All Japan Pro Wrestling
 World Junior Heavyweight Championship (1 time)
 Canadian Wrestling's Elite
 CWE Tag Team Championship (1 time) – with Danny Duggan
 Canadian Wrestling Federation
 CWF Heavyweight Championship (1 time)
 CBS Sports
 Match of the Year (2018) 
 DDT Pro-Wrestling
 DDT Extreme Championship (1 time)
 KO-D 6-Man Tag Team Championship (2 times) – with Gota Ihashi and Kota Ibushi (1), and Daisuke Sasaki and Kota Ibushi (1)
 KO-D Openweight Championship (1 time)
 KO-D Tag Team Championship (3 times) – with Kota Ibushi (2) and Michael Nakazawa (1)
 Sea of Japan 6-Person Tag Team Championship (1 time) – with Mr. #6 and Riho
 King of DDT Tournament (2012)
 Best Match Award (2012) 
 Impact Wrestling
 Impact World Championship (1 time)
 Japan Indie Awards
 Best Bout Award (2008) 
 Best Bout Award (2012) 
 Best Bout Award (2014) 
 Jersey All Pro Wrestling
 JAPW Heavyweight Championship (1 time)
 JAPW Light Heavyweight Championship (1 time)
 Lucha Libre AAA Worldwide
 AAA Mega Championship (1 time)
 New Japan Pro-Wrestling
 IWGP Heavyweight Championship (1 time)
 IWGP Intercontinental Championship (1 time)
 IWGP Junior Heavyweight Championship (2 times)
 IWGP Junior Heavyweight Tag Team Championship (1 time) – with Kota Ibushi
 IWGP United States Heavyweight Championship (2 times, current, inaugural)
 NEVER Openweight 6-Man Tag Team Championship (2 times) – with Matt Jackson and Nick Jackson
 G1 Climax (2016)
 IWGP United States Championship Tournament (2017)
 New Japan Pro-Wrestling Best Bout (2016) 
 New Japan Pro-Wrestling Best Bout (2017) 
 New Japan Pro-Wrestling MVP (2017)
 Nikkan Sports
 Match of the Year Award (2016) 
 Match of the Year Award (2017) 
 Match of the Year Award (2018) 
 Best Tag Team Award (2010) 
 Premier Championship Wrestling
 NWA Canadian X-Division Championship (1 time)
 PCW Heavyweight Championship (4 times)
 PCW Tag Team Championship (2 times) – with Rawskillz (1) and Chris Stevens (1)
 Premier Cup (2005, 2007)
 Pro Wrestling Guerrilla
 PWG World Championship (1 time)
 Battle of Los Angeles (2009)
 Pro Wrestling Illustrated
 Ranked No. 1 of the top 500 male singles wrestlers in the PWI 500 in 2018 and 2021
 Ranked No. 2 of the top 50 tag teams in the PWI Tag Team 50 in 2020 
 Feud of the Decade (2010s) 
 Feud of the Year (2017) 
 Match of the Year (2017) 
 Match of the Year (2018) 
 Match of the Year (2020) 
 Wrestler of the Year (2021)
 Ring of Honor
 ROH Year-End Award (1 time)
 Feud of the Year (2018) 
 SoCal Uncensored
 Match of the Year (2017) 
 Match of the Year (2018) 
 Sports Illustrated
 Ranked No. 2 of the top 10 men's wrestlers in 2018 – 
 Wrestler of the Year (2017)
 Tokyo Sports
 Best Bout Award (2010) 
 Best Bout Award (2017) 
 Best Bout Award (2018) 
 Technique Award (2016)
 Weekly Pro Wrestling
 Best Bout Award (2010) 
 Best Bout Award (2016) 
 Best Bout Award (2017) 
 Best Foreigner Award (2016–2018)
 Best Tag Team Award (2010) 
 Wrestling Observer Newsletter
 Wrestling Observer Newsletter Hall of Fame (Class of 2020)
 Best Wrestling Maneuver (2016–2018, 2020) 
 Feud of the Year (2017) 
 Feud of the Year (2021) 
 Japan MVP (2018)
 Most Outstanding Wrestler (2018, 2020)
 Pro Wrestling Match of the Year (2017) 
 Pro Wrestling Match of the Year (2018) 
 Pro Wrestling Match of the Year (2020) 
 United States/Canada MVP (2021)
 Wrestler of the Year (2018, 2021)

References

External links

 
 
 
 

1983 births
21st-century professional wrestlers
AAA Mega Champions
AEW World Champions
AEW World Tag Team Champions
AEW World Trios Champions
All Elite Wrestling executives
All Elite Wrestling personnel
Bullet Club members
Canadian colour commentators
Canadian emigrants to Japan
Canadian expatriate professional wrestlers in the United States
Canadian male professional wrestlers
Canadian YouTubers
Cosplayers
DDT Extreme Champions
Expatriate professional wrestlers in Japan
Expatriate professional wrestlers in Mexico
IWGP Heavyweight champions
IWGP Intercontinental champions
IWGP Junior Heavyweight champions
IWGP Junior Heavyweight Tag Team Champions
IWGP United States Champions
Japanese male professional wrestlers
Japanese people of Canadian descent
KO-D 6-Man Tag Team Champions
KO-D Openweight Champions
KO-D Tag Team Champions
Living people
NEVER Openweight 6-Man Tag Team Champions
People from Katsushika
Professional wrestlers from Manitoba
PWG World Champions
Sea of Japan 6-Person Tag Team Champions
Sportspeople from Winnipeg
TNA World Heavyweight/Impact World Champions
Twitch (service) streamers
World Junior Heavyweight Champions (AJPW)